(  ) is a bay located on the Red Sea coast of Egypt, near Hurghada, approximately 18 km south of Hurghada International Airport.

The Sahl Hasheesh Bay is home to a number of islands and coral reefs with diving and snorkeling. The nearby Abou Hasheesh Island is a local protectorate containing a thriving community of marine life.

Development
Development rights to Sahl Hasheesh are held by Egyptian Resorts Company (ERC), who purchased the land in 1995. ERC itself was founded in 1995 and publicly listed in 1999. ERC had a vision of a huge project for this area. Plans for the 12-square mile community were to be completed by 2020. The builder's stated objective was "to create a fully integrated mixed-use resort city, with the aim of achieving long-term economic and environmental sustainability."

The residential units at Old Town and Palm beaches, in Sahl Hasheesh, were completed in 2008 and sold out quickly. Palm Beach Piazza and Family Resort Ocean Breeze are the other residential projects selling apartments and villas in Sahl Hasheesh.

In the resort town, there is a partly submerged artificial city. This artificial reef attracts fish and is popular with tourists, for diving and snorkeling.

In 2009, Oberoi Sahl Hasheesh was rated as one of the more upscale resorts in the Middle East and won first place in Trip Advisors 2016 Travelers Choice Award of top 25 Luxury Hotels in Egypt. Other hotels at the resort were in the top 10 of Hurgada hotels, as well.

In 2015, Bloomberg Financial reported that the developer was struggling to sell its properties and had lost a lot of value in its stock. But in 2016, the developer had a strong financial balance sheet and its hotels were being highly rated by tourists from around the world. In 2016, tourism was returning to pre-revolution levels.

Another developer, Inertia Holdings had projects in Sahl Hasheesh as of 2018.

Climate
The climate of Sahl Hasheesh is characterised by coastal aridity, with hot and dry summers and mild winters. Rainfall amounts are low and infrequent.

See also
 Red Sea Riviera
 Marsa Alam
 El Gouna
 List of cities and towns in Egypt

References

Resort towns
Geography of Egypt
Red Sea Governorate
 
Red Sea
Resorts in Egypt
Seaside resorts in Egypt